The following are lists of role-playing games modules:

 List of Dungeons & Dragons modules
 List of Eberron modules and sourcebooks
 List of Forgotten Realms modules and sourcebooks
 List of Dungeon Crawl Classics modules
 List of Dark Sun modules and sourcebooks
 List of Dragonlance modules and sourcebooks

See also
 List of Apache modules, available for the Apache web server
 Comparison of 802.15.4 radio modules